"Icon" is a song by American rapper Jaden from his debut studio album Syre (2017). The song was released on November 17, 2017.

Background
Written by Jaden, Melvin Lewis and Omarr Rambert, the song is Jaden's most successful single as lead artist.

The song samples "The Hi De Ho Man", originally performed by Cab Calloway.

Music video
The official music video for the song was released on 17 November 2017. It features Jaden performing next to a black Tesla Model X with all the doors open.

Remixes
An official remix of the song featuring American singer-rapper Nicky Jam, with an accompanied music video was released on May 25, 2018.

Another remix of the song, title: "Icon (Reggaeton Remix)", also featuring Nicky Jam, as well as Jaden's father and rapper Will Smith, was released on June 11, 2018.

Another remix was released on July 12, 2018 in Jaden's EP Syre: The Electric Album titled "Icon?".

Track listing

Chart

Certifications

References

 

2017 singles
2017 songs
Roc Nation singles